Étang de l'Or (Occitan: Estanh de l'Òrt "Garden pond") is a lake in Hérault, France. At an elevation of 0 m, its surface area is 30 km².

See also
 Étang du Méjean

Or
Gulf of Lion